Trixie Mattel: Moving Parts is a documentary film starring drag queen and singer-songwriter Trixie Mattel. It was directed by Nick Zeig-Owens and produced by David Silver, and premiered at the Tribeca Film Festival on April 25, 2019. Following screenings, Mattel performed several songs on stage. The documentary was made available on video on demand platforms on December 3, 2019.

Synopsis
The film follows Mattel's rise to fame and subsequent country music career, as well as life after her win of season three of RuPaul's Drag Race All Stars, including the struggles of performing and touring.

Reception

Awards and nominations

Soundtrack

Trixie Mattel: Moving Parts (The Acoustic Soundtrack) is the accompanying the soundtrack extended play for the film, released on December 20, 2019. It features both original songs and covers performed in one take by Mattel on guitar, and includes new acoustic versions of the title song as well as the cast version of "Kitty Girl" performed on the finale of RuPaul's Drag Race All Stars season 3. The song "Hello, Goodbye, Hello" is originally from Firkus' 2009 EP Greener.

References

2019 films
2019 documentary films
2019 LGBT-related films
American LGBT-related films
American documentary films
Documentary films about entertainers
Documentary films about singers
Documentary films about LGBT topics
Drag (clothing)-related films
2010s English-language films
2010s American films